{{Infobox person
| image         = 
| alt           = 
| caption       = 
| birth_name    = 
| birth_place   = Sydney, Australia
| birth_date    = 
| death_date    = 
| death_place   = 
| nationality   = Australian
| other_names   = Phillippa Baker
| occupation    = Actress (retired)
| years_active = 1953–1989 
| known_for     = Number 96 
| notable_works = Blue Hills (radio serial), The Norman Gunston Show (guest role)
}}
Philippa Baker, credited also as Phillippa Baker (born 1932), is an Australian retired actress of radio, theatre, television and film. Baker started her career in theatre and radio in the early 1950s and appeared in cameos in a few TV soap operas, primarily for Crawford Productions, but is better known for her numerous roles in made-for-television features and mini-series. 

However, she is best known for playing deli worker Roma Lubinski, later Godolfus in the soap opera Number 96, as well as had a small role in the hit 1988 film Young Einstein starring Yahoo Serious.

Baker left the acting industry the following year in 1989, after more than 35 years of performing, and continued to work a regular day job as a public librarian, before retiring 

Early life and education
Baker was born in Sydney, Australia in 1932 and attended the Independent Theatre, training under Doris Fitton.

Career
Theatre and radio
Baker appeared in theatre roles from 1953 to 1989. 

She acted in the long-running radio serial Blue Hills, spending five years playing a Scottish nurse.

Television and film

Baker appeared in television plays by the Australian Broadcasting Corporation from 1958 onwards, and then featured in a few different roles in early Crawford Productions police procedurals Homicide and Division Four.  
 
Baker however became best known for playing Roma in top-rated soap opera Number 96. She joined as Russian emigrant Roma Lubinski early in the show's run in 1972, becoming a comedy double-act with Johnny Lockwood, who played her character's soon-to-be husband Aldo, the deli proprietor. They reprised their roles in the 1974 feature film version of Number 96. They were written out of the serial in late 1974 with all the attached publicity, but returned several weeks later: it was always planned as a temporary absence and the media stories a publicity stunt.

By August 1975 the program's ratings had entered a slump and a drastic revamp of the show was planned. The writers decided to write out several high-profile characters, so in early September 1975 the show's famous bomb blast killed four residents including Roma and Aldo. In 1976 Baker and co-star Lockwood appeared in ...And They Said It Wouldn't Last, a retrospective celebrating the 1000th episode of Number 96.

In 1976 Baker joined comedy series The Norman Gunston Show in a recurring sketch The Checkout Chicks, a parody of melodramatic soap operas set in a supermarket. The Checkout Chicks featured other former Number 96 actors Abigail, Vivienne Garrett, Candy Raymond, Judy Lynne and Anne Louise Lambert.

In 1977, she appeared in the guest role of Mrs Jamison (Dennis Jamison's mother) in the soap opera The Young Doctors.

Through the 1980s Baker made various appearances in theatre, television and film. She had small roles in high-profile films Annie's Coming Out (1984) and Young Einstein'' (1988). When not acting, Baker returned to her career as a public librarian until her retirement.

Filmography (selected)

Radio

Notes

External links

Australian stage actresses
Australian television actresses
Living people
Australian film actresses
1932 births